The following is a list of notable events and releases of the year 2019 in Icelandic music.

Events

January

February

March

April 
 25 – The 7th Sonar Reykjavik festival start (April 25 – 27).

May

June

July 
 4 – The 20th Folk music festival of Siglufjordur starts in Siglufjordur (July 4 – 8).
 10 – The 14th Eistnaflug festival starts in Neskaupstaður (July 10 - 13).

August

September

October

November

December

See also 
 2019 in Iceland
 Music of Iceland
 Iceland in the Eurovision Song Contest 2019

References

Icelandic music
Icelandic
2019 in Iceland